Jaffrea erubescens is a species of plant in the family Rhamnaceae. It is endemic to New Caledonia.

References

Rhamnaceae
Endemic flora of New Caledonia
Vulnerable plants
Taxonomy articles created by Polbot
Taxa named by Henri Ernest Baillon